Statistics of Kuwaiti Premier League in the 1980–81 season.

Overview
Al Salmiya Club won the championship.

References
RSSSF

1980-81
1980–81 in Asian association football leagues
1